"Can I Be Him" is a song performed by British singer and songwriter James Arthur. The song was released as a digital download on 15 April 2017 in the United Kingdom by Columbia Records as the third single from his second studio album, Back from the Edge (2016). The song became a moderate hit on a number of charts.  As of 2021, it had sold 652,698 copies in the UK.

Music video
On 8 May 2017, Vevo released the music video "Can I Be Him" on YouTube. It shows James Arthur performing the song in a moving subway carriage. He also seems to have some distant eye contact with two girls. The interior subway shots were mainly made in a DT3 unit servicing the U3 line of the Nuremberg U-Bahn, Germany.

Track listing

Charts

Certifications

Release history

References

2016 songs
2017 singles
James Arthur songs
Songs written by James Arthur
Columbia Records singles
Song recordings produced by Red Triangle (production team)
Songs written by Rick Parkhouse
Songs written by George Tizzard
Songs written by Negin Djafari